Neelakshi Singh (born 17 March 1978) is a contemporary Hindi author. In 2004 she won Sahitya Academy Golden Jubilee Award, Kalinga Book of the year award 2021 & Valley of Words Award 2022.

Personal life 
Neelakshi Singh was born at Hajipur in Bihar on 17 March 1978. She graduated from Benaras Hindu University in 1998 with a bachelor's degree in economics. At present, she is an employee with the State Bank of India.

Literary work 
Singh's short story collections "Parinde ka Intezaar saa Kuchh" and "Jinki Muthhiyon me Surakh Thaa" have been praised by literary critics. The title story of her Parinde collection stands as a classic story in contemporary Indian literature. Her new novel "Khela" is a masterpiece and acclaimed for its powerful narration and language. The novel is a cartography of structures of power, politics of oil, international conflicts and above all shades of resistance of an ordinary individual. Khela won KLF book of the year award 2021, Prof O.P. Malviya & Bharti Devi Samman 2021 and Valley of Words Award 2022. Her latest non-fiction title- "Hukum Desh ka Ikka Khota" won the first Setu Pandulipi Samman 2022.

Publications 
Khela (Novel)
Parinde Ka Intzaar sa Kuchh
Parindey Ka Intezaar Sa Kuchh (Ek Kitab Ek Kahani Series)
Shuddhi Patra (Novel)
Jinki Muthhiyon Mein Surakha Tha
Jise Jahan Nahin Hona Tha
Ibtida Ke Aage Khali Hi
Hukum Desh ka Ikka Khota

Films and media 
She was the main protagonist of the documentary film "Through the Eyes of Words" directed by Shweta Merchant, produced by NHK, Japan.

Awards 
2022- Valley of Words Award 2022- Khela Novel
2021- Kalinga Book of the Year Award 2021- Khela Novel
2021-Prof O.P. Malviya and Bharti Devi Samman 2021- Khela Novel 
 2002– Ramakant Smriti Puraskar
 2004– Katha Award
 2004– Golden Jubilee Sahitya Academy Award
Bhartiya Bhasha Parishad Yuva Puraskar 2005

References 

1978 births
Living people
Banaras Hindu University alumni
Hindi-language writers
People from Hajipur
Recipients of the Sahitya Akademi Award
Women writers from Bihar
Recipients of the Sahitya Akademi Golden Jubilee Award